Harold Kenneth Dorman (December 23, 1926 – October 8, 1988) was an American rock and roll singer and songwriter.

Biography
Dorman was born in Drew, Mississippi. He wrote a song called "Mountain of Love", which he released as a single in 1960 on the Rita record label. The song became a hit in the U.S., selling over a million copies and reaching No. 7 on the R&B singles chart and No. 21 on the Billboard Hot 100. Though it was Dorman's only hit record, it proved to be a popular song for covers; Charley Pride, Johnny Rivers, and Ronnie Dove all hit the U.S. chart with the song, and it was also recorded by Bruce Springsteen, The Beach Boys, Tommy Cash, and Narvel Felts.

He also wrote three songs for country music and blues singer pianist Moon Mullican in the early 1960s. These songs are the blues song "Mr Tears"; the honky tonk ballad "Just to be With You"; and the bluesy country drinking song "This Glass I Hold".

Dorman died in October 1988 while traveling in McKinney, Texas, at the age of 61. At the time of his death, Dorman lived in Memphis, Tennessee.

Bear Family Records posthumously reissued an album of Dorman's recordings in 1999.

References 

1926 births
1988 deaths
People from Drew, Mississippi
American rock musicians
Songwriters from Mississippi
American rockabilly musicians
Top Rank Records artists
20th-century American singers
Country musicians from Mississippi
20th-century American male singers
American male songwriters